Kokkinia is a village and a community of the Grevena municipality. Before the 2011 local government reform it was a part of the municipality of Irakleotes, of which it was a municipal district. The 2011 census recorded 223 residents in the village and 242 residents in the community. The community of Kokkinia covers an area of 16.28 km2.

Administrative division
The community of Kokkinia consists of two separate settlements: 
Kokkinia (population 223)
Nea Trapezounta (population 19)
The aforementioned population figures are as of 2011.

See also
 List of settlements in the Grevena regional unit

References

Populated places in Grevena (regional unit)